Brazil sent competitors to the 2018 Winter Paralympics in Pyeongchang, South Korea. The team included one man and one woman. Both people competed in para-Nordic skiing. Aline Rocha is the first woman to be part of the Brazilian team at the Winter Paralympics. It is the second time Brazil went to the Winter Paralympics. They first went in 2014 to the Winter Paralympics in Sochi.

Team 
Brazil sent two people to Pyeongchang for the 2018 Winter Paralympics. The team included Aline Rocha. She is the first woman to be part of the Brazilian team at the Winter Paralympics. The country wanted to send five people to South Korea. They had the right to two spots in December 2017. One spot was for a man and one spot was for a woman.

The table below contains the list of members of people (called "Team Brazil") that participated in the 2018 Games.

History 
Brazil first competed at the Winter Paralympics in 2014 in Sochi. André Cintra competed in snowboarding. Fernando Aranha competed in cross-country skiing.

Cross-country skiing

Men

Women

Relay

Snowboarding

Banked slalom

Snowboard cross

References 

Nations at the 2018 Winter Paralympics
2018
Paralympics